Legislative elections in France are expected to be held in 2027 to elect the 577 members of the 16th National Assembly of the Fifth French Republic. The elections are expected to take place following the 2027 French presidential election. However there has been speculation that President Macron could call a snap legislative election if his government loses an important vote in the National Assembly, as he lacks a legislative majority and has the constitutional right to call snap elections.

Background 
Following the 2022 French legislative election, Ensemble lost its majority in the National Assembly. Among the member parties of the coalition was Emmanuel Macron's party, Renaissance - for the first time since 1997, the incumbent president stopped having absolute majority in the Parliament. Meanwhile the two main opposition groups, left-wing New Ecological and Social People's Union (NUPES) and far-right National Rally (RN) saw a surge in seats won. Despite that, no group won the absolute majority, resulting in a hung parliament for the first time since 1988.

There has been speculation that President Macron could call a snap legislative election if his government loses an important vote in the National Assembly, as he lacks a legislative majority and has the constitutional right to call snap elections.

Opinion polls

Graphical summary

First round

Seat projections

References

See also
Legislative elections in France

Legislative elections in France
Future elections in France
France
France